Bhagwan Valmiki Tirath Asthan is temple panorama complex and an important historical monument of Valmikis located at Bhagwan Valmiki Tirath road of Amritsar city. Since 1 December 2016, it has an 8-foot-tall 800-kg gold-plated idol of Sage Valmiki in main section.

Ancient History
Bhagwan Valmiki Tirath Asthan, dedicated to Maharishi Valmiki ji  is situated 11 km west of Amritsar on Amritsar Lopoke road. As per the mythological beliefs, The temple dates back to the period of Ramayana and the place is famous for the ashram of sage Maharishi Valmiki. It is the place where the sage gave shelter to Sita, wife of Rama when she was abandoned after the Lanka Victory. The place is birthplace of Lava and Kusha, sons of Ramachandra, in ashrama of Saint Balmiki. The great epic Ramayana is also said to have been written here by Maharishi Valmiki. It is also believed that the fight between Lord Ram Chandra's forces and Lav and Kush had also taken place at Ram Tirth.

Management
Bhagwan Valmiki Tirath Asthan is managed and maintained by Valmiki Tirath Development Board. There was dispute regarding the management of site between Mahant Baldev Giri and Mahant Malkeet Nath of the Bhagwan Valmiki Dhuna Sahib Management Trust. In 2013, Punjab Police was deployed at the site, due to tension between Mahants and Valmikis. On 9 September 2014, Punjab government failed to restore the possession of Dhuna Sahib and two other sites at the ancient shrine to mahant Baldev Giri on court orders. On 11 September 2014, Police with the help of Border Security Force broker a compromise between the two parties.

Development
Foundation stone of Bhagwan Valmiki Tirath Asthan was laid on 18 October 2016  and this project was designed by Department of Architecture of Guru Nanak Dev University. It was inaugurated on 1 December 2016 by the Chief Minister of Punjab. 

Gallery

See also
 Hinduism
 Lord Valmiki
 Tourism in Amritsar

References

Tourist attractions in Amritsar
Buildings and structures in Amritsar
Hindu pilgrimage sites in India
Organisations based in Amritsar
Religion in Punjab, India